The 1947 Nobel Prize in Literature was awarded to the French author André Gide "for his comprehensive and artistically significant writings, in which human problems and conditions have been presented with a fearless love of truth and keen psychological insight".

Laureate

André Gide's early works such as the prose poem Les nourritures terrestres ("Fruits of the Earth", 1897) were influenced by French symbolism. Later notable works include The L'Immoraliste ("The Immoralist", 1902), La Porte Étroite ("Strait is the Gate", 1907) and La Symphonie pastorale ("The Pastoral Symphony", 1919). The autobiographical Si le grain ne meurt ("If It Die...", 1924) is regarded as one of the great works of confessional literature. In 1926, his most complex novel Les faux-monnayeurs ("The Counterfeiters") was published.

Deliberations

Nominations
André Gide had only been nominated for the prize once before in 1946. In 1947, the Nobel committee received 43 nominations for 35 individuals including T. S. Eliot (awarded in 1948), Boris Pasternak (awarded in 1958), Teixeira de Pascoaes, Jules Romains, Angelos Sikelianos, Carl Sandburg, Georges Duhamel, Ignazio Silone, Benedetto Croce, Ramon Perez de Ayala, Arnulf Øverland, Johan Falkberget and Marie Under. Eleven were nominated first-time such as Pär Lagerkvist (awarded in 1951), Ernest Hemingway (awarded in 1954), Mikhail Sholokov (awarded in 1965), Shmuel Yosef Agnon (awarded in 1966), Toyohiko Kagawa, Georgios Drossinis, Nikos Kazantzakis, Bernard O'Dowd and André Malraux. Most nominations were submitted for Henriette Charasson and Charles-Ferdinand Ramuz with three nominations each. Four were female nominees namely Henriette Charasson, Maria Madalena de Martel Patrício, Maila Talvio and Marie Under.

The authors James Agate, Marie Belloc Lowndes, J. D. Beresford, Tristan Bernard, Jean-Richard Bloch, Svend Borberg, Wolfgang Borchert, Margaret Cameron, Emilio Carrere, Willa Cather, Sigurd Christiansen, Winston Churchill, Morris Raphael Cohen, Ananda Coomaraswamy, Max Dessoir, Léon-Paul Fargue, Joaquín Gallegos Lara, Edith Maud Hull, Richard Le Gallienne, William Le Queux, Gurli Linder, Hugh Lofting, Manuel Machado, Arthur Machen, Emma Orczy, Nicholas Roerich, Margaret Marshall Saunders, Balys Sruoga, Flora Thompson, E. C. Vivian, Swami Vipulananda and Alfred North Whitehead died in 1947 without having been nominated for the prize.

Notes

References

External links
Award ceremony speech by Anders Österling

Nobel Prize in Literature by year